The Kenya International is an annual open international badminton tournament held in Kenya. This tournament organized by the  Kenya Badminton Association, with the sanctioned by the Badminton Confederation of Africa (BCA) and Badminton World Federation (BWF).

History
In 1965, badminton is already played by the Kenyan people, when the Kenya Gazette implied the change of the name of Nairobi Badminton Association to Kenya Badminton Association. This tournament is one of the oldest badminton tournament in Africa, and established before the BCA was founded in 1977, which the former All England Open champion, Punch Gunalan of Malaysia, won the men's doubles title in 1972. In 2006, the tournament was a Future Series event, and since 2009 upgrading to International Series with the total prize money $5,000. In 2008, the tournament was held at the Premier Club in Nairobi, with players from ten countries compete. In 2009, it was held at the Moi Sports Centre, Kasarani, in the same time with African Badminton Championships. The Moi Sports Centre continues to host the tournament, and in 2014, was moved to Safaricom Stadium Kasarani.

Tournament winners

Performances by nation

References

Badminton tournaments
Badminton in Kenya
Sports competitions in Kenya
Sport in Nairobi